Tales from Silver Lands is a book by Charles Finger that won the Newbery Medal in 1925.

The book is a collection of nineteen folktales of the native populations of Central and South America. Collected during Finger's travels, it was one of the first volumes of South American indigenous folktales available to children. Finger also includes information about how the tales were told, including some cultural norms, and any items used in telling the story.

References

External links
 

Newbery Medal–winning works
American children's books
Collections of fairy tales
Children's short story collections
1924 short story collections
Latin American folklore
Doubleday, Page & Company books
1924 children's books